The Church of St Peter, Cowleigh, is a Grade II listed Anglican church in the parish of Malvern Link and Cowleigh. It was built in 1865, and was designed by George Edmund Street.

Gallery

References

External links
Official Site
Historic England
Church of England

Buildings and structures in Malvern, Worcestershire
Church of England church buildings in Worcestershire
Grade II listed churches in Worcestershire